Sir Charles John FitzRoy Rhys Wingfield   (18 February 1877 – 26 March 1960) was a British diplomat who was envoy to several countries.

Career
Charles Wingfield was educated at Charterhouse and wished to join the Army (like his father and three brothers) but was prevented by poor health. He did join a militia battalion of the Royal Fusiliers in 1895, promoted to Captain in 1898, but as he was not allowed to serve in the South African War, he left the army in 1901 to join the Diplomatic Service as an attaché. His early postings were at Paris, Athens, Berlin and Madrid; in 1909 he was posted to Christiania (now Oslo) where he acted as chargé d'affaires in the absence of the Minister in 1909, 1910 and 1911; in 1915 he moved to Tokyo in 1915 and spent the rest of the war there; in 1919 he was promoted to Counsellor and sent back to Madrid where he again served as chargé d'affaires in 1920, 1921 and 1922; to Brussels in 1922 (chargé d'affaires 1923, 1924, 1925); and to Rome in 1926 (chargé d'affaires 1926, 1927, 1928). In 1928 he gained his first post as head of mission, as Envoy Extraordinary and Minister Plenipotentiary to the King of Siam, but he stayed there less than a year before returning to Oslo as envoy to Norway. He was envoy to the Holy See 1934–35 and finally Ambassador to Portugal 1935–37, an important post at the time because of the effect on Portugal of the Spanish Civil War.

Family
Charles Wingfield, a great-great-grandson of Richard Wingfield, 4th Viscount Powerscourt, was the third son of Edward Rhys Wingfield who had inherited Barrington Park, near Great Barrington, Gloucestershire, from his maternal grandfather George Rice-Trevor, 4th Baron Dynevor (members of the Wingfield family still own Barrington Park). In 1905 Charles Wingfield married Lucy Evelyn, elder daughter of Sir Edmund Fane, also a diplomat; later that year her sister Etheldred Constantia Fane married another diplomat, Horace Rumbold.

Honours
Charles Wingfield was appointed Companion of the Order of St Michael and St George (CMG) in the 1927 Birthday Honours and knighted in the same order in the 1933 New Year Honours.

References
WINGFIELD, Sir Charles John FitzRoy Rhys, Who Was Who, A & C Black, 1920–2008; online edn, Oxford University Press, Dec 2012
Sir Charles Wingfield (obituary), The Times, London, 29 March 1960, page 17

External links

1877 births
1960 deaths
People educated at Charterhouse School
Charles
Ambassadors of the United Kingdom to Thailand
Ambassadors of the United Kingdom to Norway
Ambassadors of the United Kingdom to the Holy See
Ambassadors of the United Kingdom to Portugal
Knights Commander of the Order of St Michael and St George